Going Way Out with Heavy Trash is the second album by Heavy Trash, released in 2007.

Track list

References

2007 albums
Heavy Trash albums
Yep Roc Records albums